This is a list of Philippine Basketball Association players by the highest free throw percentage in their PBA career.

Statistics accurate as of December 23, 2022.

See also
List of Philippine Basketball Association players

References

Free Throw, Career